The Da Hinggan-Dzhagdy Mountains conifer forests ecoregion (WWF ID: PA0505) covers the Greater Khingan Mountains of northern Manchuria (China), and across the border north into Russia where it follows the mountain ridge for another 500 km to the east. The mountain forests exhibit a floral community called "Daurian flora", a combination of the Siberian taiga to the north and the Manchurian floral types to the south. The eastern slopes are steep and drained by many rivers, the western slopes are gentler, and there are grasslands on some slopes. The ecoregion is in the Palearctic realm, with a Cold semi-arid climate.

Location and description 
The ecoregion covers the Greater Khingan mountains in northern Manchuria and crosses the Amur River north into the Dzhagdy in Russia.  In China, this is in the northern parts of Inner Mongolia Autonomous Region and Heilongjiang Province.  In Russia, most of the region is in Amur Oblast.

Climate 
Because of its altitude and distance from the ocean, the ecoregion has a Subarctic climate, dry winter (Köppen climate classification Subarctic climate (Dwc)). This climate is characterized by mild summers (only 1-3 months above ) and cold winters having monthly precipitation less than one-tenth of the wettest summer month.  These climate regions tend to be found at higher elevations in the middle of continents, with wide differences between day and night temperatures.

Flora and fauna 
Because the ecoregion forms a transition zone between northern (Siberian) and southern (Manchurian) flora types, it features examples of both - approximately two-thirds of the 1,200 local species of vascular plants are Siberian, the other third Manchurian, Daurian and Mongolian.  This combination of floral communities is sometimes referred to as "Daurian flora".  The dominant trees at higher elevations are Dahurian larch (Larix gmelinii), with pine and spruce stands.  Typical trees at lower elevation include Mongolian oak (Quercus mongolica), hazel, alder, birch, poplars and elms.  The area is one of the few remaining large tracts of forest in China, but was also the scene of the largest forest fire in modern Chinese history (over 1 million hectares in 1987).

Protections 

The federally protected areas in the region are:
 Nora Nature Reserve ("Norsky").  An IUCN class Ia "strict ecological reserve" (a Zapovednik) located in the northwest section of the ecoregion, north of the Russia-China border.  Nora is representative of the northeastern part of the Amur-Zeya lowland plain between the Nora River and the Selemdzha River.  The reserve is half forested, and half bogs.  (Area: 211,168 km2).
 Zeya Nature Reserve ("Zeysky").  An IUCN class Ia "strict ecological reserve" (a Zapovednik) located in the north-central section of the ecoregion, in the mountainous headwaters of the Zeya River.  The area is heavily forested, mostly with larch and Mongolian oak.  (Area: 99,390 km2).

See also 
 List of ecoregions in Russia

References

External links 
 Map of ecoregion Da Hinggan-Dzhagdy Mountains conifer forests.  GlobalSpecies.org 

Ecoregions of China
Ecoregions of Russia
Palearctic ecoregions
Temperate coniferous forests
Montane forests